Andrius Šidlauskas may refer to:
 Andrius Šidlauskas (footballer) (born 1984), Lithuanian football player
 Andrius Šidlauskas (swimmer) (born 1997), Lithuanian swimmer